Cornel Dinu (born 2 August 1948) is a Romanian retired professional footballer and manager who played as a sweeper or a defensive midfielder.

He started out his playing career at hometown club Metalul Târgoviște in 1965, and went on to spend the rest of his career at Dinamo București with which he won eight domestic trophies. Internationally, Dinu appeared in over 60 matches for the Romania national team and scored three goals. He was named the Romanian Footballer of the Year three times, in 1970, 1972 and 1974, and in the former year also finished on the 24th place in the Ballon d'Or voting.

After retiring as a player, Dinu coached Dinamo București on five occasions among other stints, initially in the role of an assistant. Between 1992 and 1993, he was at the helm of the Romania national team.

Club career
Cornel Dinu was born in Târgoviște to a Moldavian father from Bârlad who worked as a magistrate, lawyer and was a doctor of law and a Serbian mother from Târgoviște who worked as a economist. He started to play football in 1963 at the junior teams of Metalul Târgoviște, making his debut for the senior team on 17 March 1965 in a 1–0 victory, in which he gave the assist of the goal against UTA Arad in the 1964–65 Cupa României, after being noticed by Rudolf Wetzer who was the counselor of head coach Gheorghe Nuțescu. Dinu also played in the following game of the 1964–65 Cupa României in the quarter-finals against Dinamo București which ended with a 5–0 loss for Metalul where he was noticed by Dinamo's officials, later being brought there at the request of coach Traian Ionescu. 

Dinu debuted for Dinamo București in Divizia A under coach Traian Ionescu on 25 September 1966 in a 1–0 loss against Steagul Roșu Brașov. He remained at Dinamo throughout his career, winning six Divizia A titles, a competition in which he made 454 appearances and scored 53 goals, also winning two Cupa României and playing 33 games in which he scored 3 goals in European competitions. His last game played was a Divizia A match which took place on 18 June 1983 against Universitatea Craiova which ended 1–1. During his period spent at Dinamo, he graduated the Faculty of Law at the University of Bucharest in 1972, which earned him the nickname "Procurorul" (The Prosecutor).

Dinu won three times (1970, 1972, 1974) the Romanian Footballer of the Year award, also in 1970 along with Dinamo teammate Florea Dumitrache he was nominated for the Ballon d'Or. In 1979, Dinu had an offer from Bayern Munich which he refused, choosing to stay in Romania.

International career
Cornel Dinu played 67 matches and scored 3 goals for Romania (75/7 including Romania's Olympic team games), making his debut on 1 May 1968 under coach Angelo Niculescu in a friendly which ended 1–1 against Austria. He played three games at the successful 1970 World Cup qualifiers, also being used by coach Angelo Niculescu in all the minutes of the three group matches from the final tournament as Romania did not advance to the next stage. He played 9 matches at the 1972 Euro qualifiers, managing to reach the quarter-finals where Romania was defeated by Hungary, who advanced to the final tournament. Dinu played a total of five matches at the 1974 World Cup qualifiers, including being captain in Romania's biggest ever victory, a 9–0 against Finland. He also played in a 3–1 victory and a 1–1 against Greece at the 1973–76 Balkan Cup and he scored a goal in a 6–1 victory against Denmark at the Euro 1976 qualifiers where he played a total of five games. Dinu made a appearance at the 1978 World Cup qualifiers, two appearances at the Euro 1980 qualifiers, making his last appearance for the national team on 15 April 1981 in a friendly which ended with a 2–1 loss against Denmark.

For representing his country at the 1970 World Cup, Dinu was decorated by President of Romania Traian Băsescu on 25 March 2008 with the Ordinul "Meritul Sportiv" – (The Medal "The Sportive Merit") class III.

International goals
Scores and results list Romania's goal tally first, score column indicates score after each Dinu goal.

Managerial career

After ending his playing career in 1983, Dinu became the assistant coach of Nicolae Dumitru at Dinamo București, managing to win the championship, the cup and reach the 1983–84 European Cup semi-finals. The following season he started his career as head coach at Dinamo. His biggest performances as manager were two championship titles and two cups with Dinamo, also a 1–0 victory against Juventus Torino while coaching Oțelul Galați in the first round of the 1988–89 UEFA Cup, however he lost the second leg with 5–0. He also coached CS Târgoviște, ASA Târgu Mureș, Universitatea Cluj and Olt Scornicești, having a total of 218 matches as a manager in the Romanian top-division, Divizia A consisting of 118 victories, 35 draws and 65 losses.

Cornel Dinu was also the head coach of Romania's national team from April 1992 until June 1993, having a total of 13 games (7 victories, 2 draws, 4 losses) including a 5–1 home victory against Wales and a 5–2 away loss against Czechoslovakia, both games at the 1994 World Cup qualifiers.

After retirement
After he retired from his playing and coaching football career, Dinu worked in various management positions at Dinamo București. He was also guest at various radio and television shows, with football and cultural themes. He received the Honorary Citizen of Târgoviște (2015) and Bucharest (2019) titles.

Writing
Cornel Dinu wrote sports columns in the magazine "Flacăra" and the daily "Scânteia tineretului" during Romania's communist era, and after 1989 in the newspapers "Sportul", "Gazeta Sporturilor", "Dimineața", "Gândul", "Național", "Adevărul", "Cultura" and "Fanatik". He also wrote a total of five volumes, two of them being about football and three autobiographical:
 Fotbal – Tactica astăzi (Football – The tactic of today) - co-written with Ion V. Ionescu (1977)
 Fotbal – Concepția de joc (Football - The concept of the game) - co-written with Ion V. Ionescu (1982)
 Zâmbind din iarbă (Smiling from the grass) - autobiographical novel (2007)
 Jucând cu destinul (Playing with destiny) - autobiographical novel (2008)
 Misterele lui Mister (The mysteries of Mister) - autobiographical novel (2019)

Honours

Player
Dinamo București
Divizia A: 1970–71, 1972–73, 1974–75, 1976–77, 1981–82, 1982–83
Cupa României: 1967–68, 1981–82

Individual
Romanian Footballer of the Year: 1970, 1972, 1974
Ballon d'Or: 1970 (24th place)

Manager
Dinamo București
Divizia A: 1999–2000, 2001–02
Cupa României: 1999–2000, 2000–01

References

External links
Cornel Dinu's manager profile at Labtof.ro

1948 births
Living people
Sportspeople from Târgoviște
Romanian footballers
FCM Târgoviște players
FC Dinamo București players
Liga I players
1970 FIFA World Cup players
Romania international footballers
Romanian football managers
FC Dinamo București managers
ASC Oțelul Galați managers
FC Universitatea Cluj managers
Romania national football team managers
Association football defenders
Romanian sports executives and administrators
Romanian writers
Romanian male writers
20th-century Romanian writers
20th-century Romanian male writers
21st-century Romanian writers
21st-century Romanian male writers